The Mosor rock lizard (Dinarolacerta mosorensis) is a species of lizard in the family Lacertidae. It is found in Bosnia and Herzegovina, Croatia, Serbia, and Montenegro. Its natural habitats are boreal forests, temperate forests, temperate shrubland, and rocky areas. It is threatened by habitat loss.

Description
The Mosor rock lizard is a flattened lizard with a long head and slender tail. The dorsal surface is somewhat glossy and is brown, greyish-brown or olive-brown with darker mottling and speckling. The flanks are usually darker in colour and the spotting may be restricted to the mid-dorsal area. The underparts are unspotted and usually yellow or orange in adults but may be white or grey. Juveniles have pale bellies and sometimes bluish tails.

Behaviour
Its typical habitat is limestone outcrops or karst regions above the treeline. It also occurs on juniper-clad slopes, in open woodland and around springs. Females lay a single clutch of about four eggs once a year. The eggs are retained within the female for about five weeks after mating and hatch about two and a half weeks later.

Status
The extent of its habitat is declining due to logging. It is generally uncommon within its range and the International Union for Conservation of Nature has assessed its conservation status as being "vulnerable.

References

Dinarolacerta
Reptiles described in 1886
Taxa named by Juraj Kolombatović
Taxonomy articles created by Polbot